Estanciano Esporte Clube, commonly known as Estanciano, is a Brazilian football club based in Estância, Sergipe state.

History
The club was founded on June 14, 1956. They finished in the second position in the Campeonato Sergipano Série A2 in 2010, when they lost the competition to Socorrense.

Stadium
Estanciano Esporte Clube play their home games at Estádio Governador Augusto Franco, nicknamed Francão. The stadium has a maximum capacity of 8,000 people.

References

Association football clubs established in 1956
Football clubs in Sergipe
1956 establishments in Brazil